Motril Club de Fútbol was a Spanish football team based in Motril, Granada, in the autonomous community of Andalusia. Founded in 1984 and dissolved in 2012, it held home matches at Estadio Escribano Castilla, with a capacity of 4,400 seats.

History
Motril first reached the third division in 1997, remaining six consecutive seasons in the category. In 2001–02 it inclusively finished the regular season in first position (in group IV), but lost in the promotion playoffs against Getafe CF, 0–1 on aggregate.

From 2003–12, Motril competed again in the fourth level, appearing in the promotion playoffs on five occasions, always without success. In July 2012 the team folded, due to heavy debts and financial difficulties.

Season to season

6 seasons in Segunda División B
16 seasons in Tercera División

Former players
 Pablo Paz
 Noé Acosta
 Enrique
 Miguel Ángel Espínola
 Javi Guerra
 Juanlu
 Armando Lozano
 Luis Rubiales
Chupi
Dani Cara
Francisco Javier Linares Sánchez
Manuel Lucena
Rafael Wellington
Julio Caraffo

References

External links
Futbolme team profile 

Defunct football clubs in Andalusia
Association football clubs established in 1984
Association football clubs disestablished in 2012
1984 establishments in Spain
2012 disestablishments in Spain